Cham Seyyedi-ye Vosta (also Romanized as Cham Seyyedī-ye Vosţá and Cham Şeyd-e Vosţá; also known as Cham-e Seyyed and Cham-e Şeydī) is a village in Hemmatabad Rural District, in the Central District of Borujerd County, Lorestan Province, Iran. At the 2006 census, its population was 75, in 15 families.

References 

Towns and villages in Borujerd County